The Sixian dialect, also known as the Sixian accent (Sixian Hakka Romanization System: Xi ien kiongˊ / Xi ian kiongˊ; Pha̍k-fa-sṳ: Si-yen-khiông / Si-yan-khiông), is a dialect of Hakka used by Taiwanese Hakkas, and it is the most spoken dialect of Taiwanese Hakka, being used in Hakka broadcasting in many public occasions. The Sixian dialect is generally spoken in northern and southern Taiwan, with main representative regions being Taoyuan and Miaoli in the north, as well as the Liudui Region in Kaohsiung and Pingtung in the south.

Taiwanese Hakka is often called Si Hai Yong Le Da Ping An, referring to the Sixian, Hailu, Yongding, Changle, Dabu, Raoping and Zhao'an dialects. Among these, the Sixian and Changle dialects originate in Jiaying Prefecture, Guangdong, established in 1733 during the Qing Dynasty under the rule of Yongzheng Emperor. Historically, the Jiaying Prefecture governed five counties. The Sixian dialect comes from the four counties of Chengxiang (now Meixian), Zhengping (now Jiaoling), Xingning and Pingyuan, giving it the name Sixian (four counties); the Changle dialect originates in its eponym, the county of Changle (now Wuhua). Currently, speakers of the Yongding and Changle dialects have basically left their own accent families, so only the Sixian, Hailu, Dabu, Raoping and Zhao'an dialects remain in use in Taiwan. In Taiwan, the only widely used Hakka dialects are Sixian and Hailu.

The Sixian dialect of Taiwan is slightly different from the Meixian dialect of mainland China since the majority of immigrants from Jiaying Prefecture are from Zhenping County, which is present-day Jiaoling County, so the Sixian dialect is closer to the Jiaoling dialect of mainland China. There are also differences in vocabulary and phonology between the Sixian dialect spoken in northern Taiwan (called Northern Sixian or Miaoli dialect) and in Liudui of southern Taiwan (called Southern Sixian). Because of the differences between the two varieties of Sixian, the recitation contests in the National Language Competition separate the contest into the two accents of (Northern) Sixian and Southern Sixian. Alternatively, Sixian may include Xingning and Changle, but because these two counties were formerly a part of Huizhou fu, they may be closer to the Hailu dialect.

Phonology

Consonants 

Rhymes 
According to the Handbook for Using the Hakka Romanization System published by the Taiwanese Ministry of Education, the rhymes can be split into three categories: yin rhymes, yang rhymes, and checked rhymes.

Yin rhymes 
Yin rhymes are rhymes with a pure vowel or a complex vowel.

Pure vowels

Complex vowels

Yang rhymes 
Yang rhymes end in a nasal consonant. They can be syllabic nasals or nuclei (pure or complex vowel) with nasal codas.

Syllabic nasals

Nuclei with nasal codas

Checked rhymes 
Checked rhymes end with a stop consonant (/p̚/,/t̚/,/k̚/) and a short vowel before it.

Tones 

Tone sandhi 
In compounds, if a dark-level tone is followed by a dark-level, light-entering or departing tone, the dark-level tone (24) changes to the light-level tone (11). In Southern Sixian, if a light-level tone (11) is not in the end of a compound, it is changed to the dark-level tone (33 in Meinong). In the Dalukuan and Guangfu Village accents, there are seven tone sandhi rules: the "low" dark-level and light-level tones mostly become a mid tone (33) or a high rising tone (35); thus, the tones of these two areas sound higher than the other areas in Liudui.

Related Hakka dialects 

In China, the Dabu and Fengshun Counties originally belonging to the Chaozhou fu have been combined with the former Jiaying Prefecture, establishing Meizhou. Historically, other than the Sixian and Changle dialects, the Dabu and Fengshun dialects were also brought to Taiwan from areas presently governed by Meizhou in China. The Fengshun dialect mainly originates in Fengshun and Jieyang Counties. However, in Taiwan, speakers of the Dabu and Fengshun dialects are still traditionally considered to be Chaozhou Hakkas. Other than the Dabu and Fengshun dialects, the Raoping dialect is also from Chaozhou, specifically the Raoping and Huilai Counties.

In Taiwan, the Sixian dialect is the most spoken dialect spoken by the Hakkas, and following is the Hailu dialect (Sixian Hakka Romanization System: hoiˋ liug kiongˊ). The Hailu dialect originates in Huizhou fu (present-day Huizhou and Shanwei) in mainland China, so it is also sometimes called the Huizhou dialect. Since there are many Hakka dialects in Taiwan, when Taiwanese Hakkas interact with each other, there may be influences from other dialects, forming a dialect between the Sixian and Hailu dialects called the Si-Hai dialect (or Hai-Si dialect). The Sihai dialect is not a particular accent, but is just formed because of the interaction between different Hakka groups. Taiwanese Hakka can generally be classified under the Yue-Tai dialects, which are also called the Si-Hai dialects.

The Sixian, Hailu, Changle, Dabu and Raoping dialects all come from Guangdong, China, so Taiwanese Hakkas trace back their origins to Guangdong. Even Hakkas from Tingzhou fu, Fujian, consider themselves to be from Yuedong (Guangdong). Therefore, there is a parallel between "Yuedong Hakkas" and "Minnan Hoklos". Taiwanese Hakka dialects from Fujian include the Yongding, Zhao'an and Tingzhou dialects. The Yongding dialect originates in the Yongding, Shanghang and Wuping Counties of Tingzhou fu. Its phonology is close to Yuedong dialects (e.g. Sixian and Dabu dialects). The Tingzhou dialect originates in the Changting, Ninghua, Qingliu, Guihua and Liancheng Counties of Tingzhou fu. The Zhao'an dialect originates in the Zhao'an, Pinghe, Nanjing and Hua'an Counties of Zhangzhou fu. The Zhao'an and Tingzhou dialects are quite different from the Yue-Tai (Si-Hai) dialects, making them unique in Taiwan.

Notes

Works cited

 
 
 

Languages of Taiwan
Hakka Chinese
Dialects of languages with ISO 639-3 code